Club Life is a 2015 American drama film directed by Fabrizio Conte and starring Jerry Ferrara, Danny A. Abeckaser, Jessica Szohr, Robert Davi, Ryan O'Nan, Tovah Feldshuh and Jay R. Ferguson.

Cast
Jerry Ferrara as Johnny D
Danny A. Abeckaser as Mark
Robert Davi as Bobby
Tovah Feldshuh
Jessica Szohr as Tanya
Jay R. Ferguson as Steven
Ryan O'Nan as Sebastian

Release
The film was released in select theaters on May 29, 2015.

Reception
The film has a 20% rating on Rotten Tomatoes based on five reviews.

The Hollywood Reporter gave the film a negative review: "Lacking the dramatic substance that would make us care about its central character, Club Life lives up to its setting in that it's quickly forgotten by the next day."

Gary Goldstein of the Los Angeles Times also gave the film a negative review and wrote, "...the film is undermined by choppy editing and a penchant for hoary aphorisms and forced gravitas."

References

External links
 
 

2015 films
2015 drama films
American drama films
2010s English-language films
2010s American films